Loveless was a Boston-based indie rock band.  Releasing records on Q Division Records, the band was composed of Dave Wanamaker and Pete Armata, both of the 1990s rock band Expanding Man, Jen Trynin, and Tom Polce from Letters to Cleo.

Formation
The band formed as a project by Wanamaker and Armata in 1999.  They both recruited Polce to play drums, and Wanamaker successfully included Trynin in a guitar-playing/ back-up vocalist role.  In 2000, the band, named after the My Bloody Valentine album Loveless, threw together a 5-song EP, featuring four tracks that would appear on their future full-length album, and one other track, "Natural."  During this time, the band began to tour around the Northeast area, playing a few shows every month, especially in New York City and Boston, where the members resided.

Gift to the World
The band had to take a break in the midst of preparing the new album because of Trynin's pregnancy, extending the wait between EP and album to 3 years.  Polce has stated that they had initially planned to release the album a year after the EP, but when Trynin announced she was pregnant, they collectively decided to wait to release the album until she would be able to tour with them.

The band finally released the full-length album, Gift to the World, on November 11, 2003.  The album received critical acclaim from many publications, including The Boston Globe, Rolling Stone, and Spin Magazine.  The lead single, "Go," received considerable airplay on Boston and New York radio, and was included in an online campaign for the Abercrombie & Fitch clothing company.  However, following the release, the band didn't tour or promote the album as many expected them to.  The record release show wasn't held until January 18, 2004, two months after the album release.  From then on, the band played a lot of one-off opening shows, never really hitting a touring stride or playing another headlining show.

During a show opening for Kay Hanley in August 2004, at The Paradise Rock Club in Boston, Massachusetts, Wanamaker announced it as being the last Loveless show ever, stating that, "I think the band is done."  Since that show, the band has gone on an indefinite hiatus.

On January 10, 2015, Expanding Man reunited for a one-off concert at Brighton Music Hall in Boston. Loveless opened the show (since half the band was playing with Expanding Man anyway) and played a blistering set for not having played together in over 10 years. However, the show proved to be just an isolated reunion, and the band has since gone on 'hiatus.'

Post-Loveless
 Dave Wanamaker has continued as a guitarist and songwriter most recently featured on releases by Howie Day and New York based Ocean Carolina. He is set to release a new solo record Shelter in the fall of 2016 on Fake Chapter Records.
 Jen Trynin released a book, Everything I'm Cracked Up to Be, documenting her years as a solo artist struggling in Boston's indie scene, to signing with Warner Bros. Records.  Loveless is not referenced in the book, as the timeline culminates before her time in the band.
 Tom Polce has continued producing, engineering, and mixing albums; in 2007 he relocated to Los Angeles and works for CBS Records
 Pete Armata lives in Long Island.

Discography
 The Loveless EP (CD) - Q Division - 2000
 Gift to the World (CD) - Q Division - 2003

External links
 Official site
 Boston Globe: With a firm grasp on life's realities, this band dares not to dream.

Indie rock musical groups from Massachusetts
Musical groups from Boston